Angeliki Artemis Diane Rigos is a research director, a business consultant, and a former University Professor. Rigos is primarily known for her work on Brownian dynamics simulations and theories of protein and co-polymer aggregation, as well as for the considerable amount of work she has done on the processing of military waste.

Biography
Rigos attained a BA in Chemistry from Cornell University in 1979, after which she moved on to do her PhD in Physical Chemistry at the Massachusetts Institute of Technology in 1985. Rigos then moved into an industrial position as the Principal Scientist at Physical Sciences, Inc., a position she held until her appointment to the post of associate professor at Merrimack College in 1988, eventually earning a promotion to Chair of Chemistry and Biochemistry in 2012.

While at Merrimack, Rigos served as a Visiting Scientist at Harvard University, Northeastern University, and the Massachusetts Institute of Technology. She also completed an MBA at Northeastern University and became an Executive Consultant at Levitan & Associates, Inc, and volunteered as an Industry Champion at MassChallenge and as a mentor at Cleantech Open.

Rigos ultimately left Merrimack College in 2016 and became the Executive Director of the Tata Center at the Massachusetts Institute of Technology. She has since become involved in various organizations promoting women in science, including the Association for Women in Science, whose Massachusetts division she serves as Vice President.

Select publications

References

External links

 Tata Center Profile page

Living people
Greek scientists
Greek chemists
Massachusetts Institute of Technology School of Science alumni
Cornell University alumni
Year of birth missing (living people)